William Kent (1751 or 1760 – 1812) was a British Royal Navy officer, known for his part in developing British settlement in Australasia.

Life
He was the son of Henry Kent of Newcastle-on-Tyne and his wife Mary, a sister of Governor John Hunter. Hunter was the new and only the second governor of the colony. Hunter was a single man, so William's wife, Eliza would take up the role of his escort at the governor's receptions. It is thought that Eliza was the first woman to have official duties in Australia.

The ships arrived at Sydney on 7 September, and for the next five years Kent was employed in the service of the colony, making voyages to Norfolk Island and the Cape of Good Hope, and surveying parts of the coast of New South Wales.

The following April he was ordered to go to Norfolk Island with stores, and then through the islands examining their capabilities as to the supply of cattle and forage. He was to go on to Calcutta and bring back as many cows as possible of the best breed. On 19 May he made the south-west coast of New Caledonia, and discovered a harbour, which he named Port St Vincent (Saint Vincent Bay), where he remained for several weeks.

In January 1804 Kent was at Calcutta, and returned to Port Jackson in June, bringing back cattle and other stores. He was afterwards moved into , which had undergone repair, and in 1805 sailed her to Britain with intelligence about the state of Peru.

Investigator was paid off at Plymouth on 22 December 1805, and on 23 January 1806 Kent was advanced to post captain. While in command of Union he died 29 August 1812 off Toulon.

Family
In 1791 Kent married his cousin Eliza Kent, daughter of William Kent of Newcastle-on-Tyne, and left one son, born at Sydney in 1799.

See also
 The Kent Group of islands in Bass Strait

References

Attribution

1750s births
1812 deaths
Royal Navy officers
Military personnel from Newcastle upon Tyne